"Why Do Lovers Break Each Other's Heart", sometimes shown as "Why Do Lovers Break Each Others Hearts" or "Why Do Lovers (Break Each Other's Heart)", is a pop song written by Phil Spector, Ellie Greenwich and Tony Powers.  It was written as a tribute to Frankie Lymon, and was first recorded by Bob B. Soxx and the Blue Jeans.  Their version featured lead vocals by Darlene Love, and reached no.38 on the Billboard Hot 100 in early 1963.

Cover versions
In the UK, the only hit version was by Showaddywaddy, whose recording reached no.22 on the UK singles chart in 1980.

Charts

References

1963 singles
Songs written by Ellie Greenwich
Songs written by Phil Spector
Song recordings produced by Phil Spector
Song recordings with Wall of Sound arrangements
Songs written by Tony Powers
1963 songs
Philles Records singles
Showaddywaddy songs